The 1996–97 National Football League, known for sponsorship reasons as the Church & General National Football League, was the 66th staging of the National Football League (NFL), an annual Gaelic football tournament for the Gaelic Athletic Association county teams of Ireland.

Format 
The teams are in four divisions, three of 8 teams and one of 9. Each team plays all the other teams in its division once: either home or away. Teams earn 2 points for a winn and 1 for a draw. The top two teams in Divisions 2, 3 and 4 are promoted, while the bottom two teams in Divisions 1, 2 and 3 are relegated.

Eight teams contest the NFL quarter-finals:
The top 4 teams in Division 1
The top 2 teams in Division 2
The first-placed teams in Divisions 3 and 4

Promotion and relegation

At the point at which the league was played, promotion and relegation was to be as follows:

 Division One: bottom 2 teams demoted to Division Two
 Division Two: top 2 teams promoted to Division One. Bottom 2 teams demoted to Division Three.
 Division Three: top 2 teams promoted to Division Two. Bottom 2 teams demoted to Division Four.
 Division Four: top 2 teams promoted to Division Three.

After the season had finished, it was decided to move to a 'mixed-ability' league for a one-season experiment in the 1997–98 NFL season, which meant that there was no relegation or promotion in 1996–97.

Results and tables

Division 1

Division 2

Play-Off

Division 2

Division 3

Division 4
 won, with  finishing second.

Knockout stage

Quarter-finals

Portlaoise

Semi-finals

Final

References

External links

National Football League
National Football League
National Football League (Ireland) seasons